Aspidoglossa korschefskyi is a species of ground beetle in the subfamily Scaritinae. It was described by Kult in 1950.

References

Scaritinae
Beetles described in 1950